Punyashlok Ahilyabai is an Indian Hindi-language historical drama television series that premeried on 4 January 2021 on Sony Entertainment Television. It digitally streams on Sony LIV. It is based on the life of queen Ahilyabai Holkar, who reigned over the region of Malwa from 1767 to 1795. Produced by Dashami Creations, it stars Aetashaa Sansgiri, Rajesh Shringarpure and Gaurav Amlani.

Plot
Ahilya Bai blossoms under the guidance of her father-in-law, Malhar Rao Holkar. She takes on the reign of the Malwa territory after the death of her husband and son and leads her kingdom efficiently.

Cast

Main
 Aetashaa Sansgiri as Queen Ahilyabai Holkar: Mankoji Shinde and Sushilabai's daughter; Late Khanderao's first wife; Subedar Malhar Rao Holkar and Rani Gautamabai Holkar's daughter-in-law ; Male Rao Holkar and Muktabai Holkar's mother, Mainabai's mother-in-law (2021–present)
 Aditi Jaltare as Young Ahilyabai Holkar (2021)
 Rajesh Shringarpure as Subedar Malhar Rao Holkar: The King of Malwa region under the Maratha empire; Gautama Bai, Dwarka Bai, Bana Bai and Harku Bai's husband; Khanderao and Seeta Bai's father; Gunoji, Ahilya and Parvati's father-in-law; Malerao Holkar and Muktabai Holkar's paternal grandfather (2021–present)
 Gaurav Amlani as Khande Rao Holkar: Subedar Malhar Rao Holkar and Gautamabai Holkar's only son; Seetabai's younger step-brother; Ahilyabai and Parvatibai's husband ; Male Rao Holkar and Muktabai Holkar's father (2021–2022)(dead)
 Krish Chauhan as Young Khanderao Holkar (2021)
 Sandeep Vasantrao Gaikwad as Tukoji Rao Holkar: Malhar Rao and Gautama's foster-nephew ; Khanderao and Ahilya's brother-figure and Rakhmabai's husband. (2021–present)
 Siddharth Banerjee as Tukoji Rao Holkar before the eight-year leap (2021-2022)
 James Naivedhya Ghadge played the role of young Tukoji Rao Holkar (2021)

Recurring

 Krish Chauhan as Male Rao Holkar: Ahilyabai Holkar and Khanderao Holkar's son; Muktabai Holkar's elder brother; Malhar Rao Holkar and Gautama Bai Holkar's paternal grandson, Mankoji Shinde and Sushilabai Shinde's maternal grandson, Mainabai's husband (2023–present)
 Diaan Talaviya as young Malerao Holkar (2022-2023)
 Saachi Tiwari as Muktabai Holkar: Ahilyabai Holkar and Khanderao Holkar's daughter; Male Rao Holkar's younger sister; Malhar Rao Holkar and Gautama Bai Holkar's paternal granddaughter; Mankoji Shinde and Sushilabai Shinde's maternal granddaughter (2023-present)
 Jazlyn Tanwani as young Muktabai. (2022-2023)
Shruti Panwar Ulfat as Queen Gautama Bai Holkar: Subedar Malhar Rao Holkar's first wife; Malwa's Chief Queen; Khanderao's mother; Ahilyabai and Parvatibai's mother-in-law ; Malerao Holkar and Muktabai Holkar's paternal grandmother (2022–present)
Snehlata Tawde Vasaikar as Gautamabai before the eight-year leap (2021-2022)
 Surabhi Hande as Queen Harku Bai Sahib Holkar: Subedar Malhar Rao Holkar's fourth wife (Khanda Rani); Khanderao and Ahilya's Chhoti Aai (2023-present)
 Srijana Tejveeri played the role of Harkubai Holkar before the 7 year leap. (2021)
 Sanika Gadgil played the role of Harkubai Holkar before the 6 year leap. (2022-2023)
Resham Tipnis as Queen Dwarka Bai Sahib Holkar: Subedar Malhar Rao Holkar's second wife; Seetabai's mother and Gunoji's mother-in-law (2022–present)
Sukhada Deshpande Khandkekar as Dwarkabai before 8 year leap (2021-2022)
 Kanan Malhotra as Gunoji Rao: Dhanajirao's son; Seetabai's husband; Malhar Rao Holkar and Dwarkabai Sahib's son-in-law and Malwa's ex-"sardar"(2022). (antagonist) (2022) 
 Harsh Joshi as Gunoji Rao before the eight-year leap . Malhar Rao Holkar's ex-trusted noble (2021-2022)
 Abhay Harpale as Gangoba Pant Tatya, Malhar Rao Holkar's trusted noble (2021–present)
 Saundarya Sheth as Saraja: Ahilya and Renu's best friend whose father was a thief, Dushyant's wife. (2021–present)
 Kamal Krishna Paudial as Dhanaji Rao: Gunoji Rao's father; Seetabai's father-in-law. (2021–2022) (dead)
Neil Sharma as Santaji ; Male Rao Holkar's sword-fighting mate. (2022)
 Vallari Viraj Londhe as Parvatibai Sahib Holkar: Gawdeji and Yashoda's daughter; Khanderao's one-sided-lover turned second wife; Subedar Malhar Rao Holkar and Rani Gautamabai Holkar's daughter-in-law; Malerao Holkar and Muktabai Holkar's step-mother (chhoti aai). (2022)(dead)(Currently committed Sati with Khanderao Holkar)
 Akanksha Pal as Rakhmabai Holkar: Tukoji's wife. (2021–present)(antagonist)
 Charmi Dhami played the role of young Rakhmabai Holkar.
 Sameer Deshpande as Mankoji Shinde: Sushilabai's husband; Mahadji, Vithoji and Ahilya's father; Khanderao's father-in-law ; Malerao Holkar and Muktabai Holkar's maternal grandfather. (2021–present)
 Sulakshana Joglekar as Sushilabai Shinde: Mankoji Shinde's wife; Mahadji, Vithoji and Ahilya's mother; Khanderao's mother-in-law ; Malerao Holkar and Muktabai Holkar's maternal grandmother. (2021–present)
 Unknown as Krishna; Gomati's mother; Ahilya's therapist. (2022)
 Anjali Ujawane as Yamuna Bai: Queen Dwarka Bai Holkar's assistant/maid who is like a family to her. (2021–2023)
Bhagyashree Nhalve as Bana Bai Sahib Holkar: Subedar Malhar Rao Holkar's third wife. (2021)
 Madhura Joshi as Renu: Ahilya and Saraja's best friend; Parikshit's wife. (2021)
 Shreya Choudhary played the role of young Renu.(2021)
 Snigdha Suman played the role of young Sarja.
 Trishaa Kamlakar as Seetabai Rao : Dwarka Bai and Malhar Rao Holkar's daughter; Khanderao's elder step-sister; Gunojirao's wife. (2022).             
 Varada Patil played the role of Seetabai before the 8 years leap (2021)
 Aryan Preet Mishra as Mahadji Shinde: Ahilya's elder brother; Mankoji and Sushilabai's son; Malerao Holkar and Muktabai Holkar's maternal uncle (2021)
 Sarthak Joshi as Vitthoji Shinde: Ahilya's elder brother; Mahadji's younger brother; Mankoji and Sushilabai's son; Malerao Holkar and Muktabai Holkar's maternal uncle. (2021)
 Harshit Keshawani as Kanhoji: Khanderao's childhood friend who helps him in his plans. (2021)
 Snehal Waghmare as Godabai: Rayaji's mother and Gautamabai's sister-in-law. (2021)
 Anonymous as Rangrao: Malhar Rao's spy. (2021–2022)
 Kajal Singh Maurya as Manjula. (2021)
 Jenil Panchamia as Parikshit: Khanderao's friend; Renu's husband. (2021)
Manoj Kolhatkar as Acharya. (2021)
Javed Pathan as Ahmad Shah Abdali.(2023)

Production

Development 
The series was announced by Dashami Creations and was confirmed in December 2020 by Sony TV.

Casting
Marathi actress Aetashaa Sansgiri was cast to portray the elder version of Ahilya Bai. Kinshuk Vaidya was supposed to play the elder version of Khanderao, but he opted out and was replaced by Gaurav Amlani.

Awards and nominations

See also
 List of programs broadcast by Sony Entertainment Television

References

External links

 Punyashlok Ahilyabai on Sony TV
 Punyashlok Ahilya Bai on SonyLIV

Sony Entertainment Television original programming
2021 Indian television series debuts
Indian historical television series